The Japan men's national tennis team represents Japan in Davis Cup tennis competition and is governed by the Japan Tennis Association.

Japan first competed at the Davis Cup in 1921, where they finished as runners-up.  They were an inaugural member of the World Group in 1981 and competed at the top division until 1985 when they were relegated to the second division. They are currently competing in the World Group for the eighth time.

History
Japan competed in its first Davis Cup in 1921 finishing as the runners-up to the United States.

Results

Current squad

Rankings as of 29 October 2022

Notes

References

External links

Davis Cup teams
Davis Cup
Davis Cup